The 1978 World Aquatics Championships took place in the free city of West Berlin between August 20 and August 28, 1978.

Medal table

Record(*)

Results

Diving

Men

Women

Swimming

Men

Women

Synchronised swimming

Water polo
Men

External links
FINA Official Website
World Swimming Championship Results
1978 World Aquatics Championships Results

 
FINA World Aquatics Championships
World Aquatics Championships, 1978
Sports competitions in West Berlin
1970s in West Berlin
International aquatics competitions hosted by Germany
International sports competitions hosted by West Germany